Sooke Potholes Provincial Park is a 7.28 hectare provincial park in British Columbia, Canada.  It is adjacent to the Sooke River and Sooke Potholes Regional Park, near Victoria, B.C.  Intended primarily to provide access to the Sooke River and the associated potholes, it also offers wildlife viewing and other day-use activities.

Environment 
Sooke Potholes Provincial Park, in the Leeward Island Mountains Ecosection, is primarily focused around a set of naturally-occurring, water-carved potholes along the Sooke River. Although the river is a popular swimming spot, it is also an important spawning river for chinook and coho salmon and is a main wildlife corridor between the Sooke Hills and Capital Region greenbelts. Sierra wood fern and streambank lupine, both threatened species, are important plant species that can be found in the park, as well as old-growth Douglas firs. Park animal species include the black bear, cougar and the Roosevelt elk. 

The Sooke Flowline, constructed in 1915, snakes through the nearby hills around the Sooke Potholes and travels all the way to the Humpback Reservoir near Mt. Wells Regional Park. It can be found east of the Sooke River.

Activities and Services 
The park is primarily designed to provide access to the potholes and the Sooke River for swimming, picnicking, fishing, and other recreational activities along the river. Because the potholes are located outside of the park boundaries, the park is primarily designed to allow access through the park to the Sooke River and does not have washrooms, trash bins, or other service facilities to allow anything other than day use. There are multiple trails and two parking lots to allow easy access to the potholes and the river.

References

External links

 BC Parks: Sooke Potholes Provincial Park

Greater Victoria
Provincial parks of British Columbia
Protected areas established in 1972
1972 establishments in British Columbia